, known simply as Pen Pen in Europe, is a video game created by one of the first Japanese companies to reveal Dreamcast development, General Entertainment, otherwise known as Land Ho! It was released in Japan as one of four launch titles.

Gameplay
A TriIcelon is similar to the real-world triathlon. TriIcelons consist of three separate sporting styles in one game: running, sliding, and swimming. These three things combine to make a race where everyone competes for first place. The TriIcelons take place in four courses: Sweets, Jungle, Toys, and Horror.

The player controls little penguin-like characters called Pen Pen, in a race consisting of the three separate sporting styles. Both the sliding and swimming parts are raced by tapping and holding the action button in a rhythmic motion to maintain a smooth flowing pace. The running section is controlled simply with the analogue stick, also with the ability to jump, and charge into other competitors. The playable characters include the Pen Pens Sparky and Tina, the Pen Hippo Ballery, the Pen Shark Jaw, the Pen Walrus Back, the Pen Octopus Sneak, the Pen Dog Mr. Bow, and the unknown-species Hanamizu.

Story
The Pen Pen are said to live on a small world called Iced Planet, and was here that the strange alien race were first discovered. Since the closest animal on Earth they resemble is the penguin, they were first given the name Pen Pen. The Pen Pen pretty much inhabit most of the planet's surface. It is believed they do, in fact, have their own language, but if so, it is totally incomprehensible to humans. 

It was later discovered that they come in a variety of different shapes and sizes. Other types came from other planets to visit the Iced Planet. Six types have been discovered so far.

In a world of snow, ice and water, the Pen Pen have mastered the arts of running, sliding and swimming, and always used to play about on an iced field.

These creatures saw the Pen Pen and came up with an idea, and thus, the TriIcelon was born.

This soon became the most popular sport on the Iced Planet. Pen Pens enjoy this sport everyday and never get bored of competing, but once a year, they hold a grand TriIcelon race to determine the number one TriIcelon player. The PenPen characters later made a cameo appearance on several posters in Blue Stinger'''s Christmas mall area.

Reception

The game received mixed reviews according to video game review aggregator GameRankings. Adam Pavlacka of NextGen said of the game, "If you regularly play games with a group, pick it up – otherwise make it a rental." In Japan, Famitsu'' gave it a score of 25 out of 40.

References

External links

1998 video games
Animal racing video games
Dreamcast games
Dreamcast-only games
Infogrames games
Video games developed in Japan
Multiplayer and single-player video games
General Entertainment games